Wang Xin (born 10 November 1985) is a retired badminton player from China and former World No. 1 women's singles player. She was awarded as Best Female Players of the Year by the BWF in 2010. Wang represented China in the 2012 Summer Olympics and had to forfeit the match in the bronze medal playoff game against Saina Nehwal of India in which she was 21–18, 1–0 up, due to a knee injury.

After the Olympics, Wang Xin struggled to get back into competition but was never successful due to the severity of her injury. In 2013, at the age of 28 years, she retired from professional badminton.

Achievements

BWF World Championships 
Women's singles

Asian Games 
Women's singles

BWF Superseries 
The BWF Superseries, launched on 14 December 2006 and implemented in 2007, is a series of elite badminton tournaments, sanctioned by Badminton World Federation (BWF). BWF Superseries has two level such as Superseries and Superseries Premier. A season of Superseries features twelve tournaments around the world, which introduced since 2011, with successful players invited to the Superseries Finals held at the year end.

Women's singles

  BWF Superseries Premier tournament
  BWF Superseries tournament

BWF Grand Prix 
The BWF Grand Prix had two levels, the BWF Grand Prix and Grand Prix Gold. It was a series of badminton tournaments sanctioned by the Badminton World Federation (BWF) which was held from 2007 to 2017.

Women's singles

  BWF Grand Prix Gold tournament
  BWF Grand Prix tournament

IBF International 
Women's doubles

Record against selected opponents 
Record against year-end Finals finalists, World Championships semi-finalists, and Olympic quarter-finalists.

References

External links 
 
 Profile 

1985 births
Living people
Badminton players from Shenyang
Chinese female badminton players
Badminton players at the 2012 Summer Olympics
Olympic badminton players of China
Badminton players at the 2010 Asian Games
Asian Games gold medalists for China
Asian Games silver medalists for China
Asian Games medalists in badminton
Medalists at the 2010 Asian Games
World No. 1 badminton players